Lyndon Dunshea is a New Zealand rugby union player who plays for the  in the Super Rugby competition. His position of choice is lock.

References 

New Zealand rugby union players
Living people
Rugby union locks
Auckland rugby union players
Blues (Super Rugby) players
People educated at Lincoln High School, New Zealand
1991 births